Elmore Yocum Sarles (January 15, 1859 – February 14, 1929) was an American politician who was the ninth Governor of North Dakota from 1905 to 1907.

Biography
Born in Wonewoc, Wisconsin, Sarles was educated in the public schools in Prescott, Wisconsin and the Gale College in Galesville, Wisconsin. He arrived in Hillsboro, North Dakota in 1881 where he founded the Traill County Bank and a lumberyard. He married Anna York on January 10, 1886, and had two sons and two daughters. Sarles was also founder and president of The First National Bank of Hillsboro.

Career
Elmore Sarles became the mayor of Hillsboro in 1900 and served one term through 1902. Sarles was elected Governor. "More business in government" was Sarles' motto. There was a surplus of $200,000 in the state treasury when he left the Governor's office.

Death
Sarles died on February 14, 1929, and is buried in Hillsboro Cemetery #1 (Riverside Cemetery) in Hillsboro, North Dakota.

References

External links
Biography for Elmore Y. Sarles
National Governors Association

1859 births
1929 deaths
People from Traill County, North Dakota
People from Wonewoc, Wisconsin
People from Prescott, Wisconsin
Gale College alumni
Businesspeople from North Dakota
Republican Party governors of North Dakota
Mayors of places in North Dakota
Methodists from North Dakota
20th-century American politicians